Pascual Renato de Gregorio Contreras (born 5 March 1972) is a former Chilean footballer.

Club career
With a prolific career in Chilean football, in 1999 De Gregorio moved to Italy and joined Serie A side A.S. Bari after a great step with Coquimbo Unido, where played alongside the former Italy international footballers Simone Perrotta and Antonio Cassano. In addition, he played for Gansu Tianma in China.

Coaching career

Personal life
He is the older brother of Diego de Gregorio, who played as forward for clubs like Audax Italiano, Deportes Melipilla (where Pascual played), Rangers, among others. His son, Pascual Patricio, is also a footballer who has played at lower categories of both Chilean and Italian football.

Honours

Club
Rangers
 Primera B (1): 1997 Apertura

Cobreloa
 Primera División de Chile (1): 2002 Apertura

References

External links
 
 Pascual de Gregorio at Chilenos por el Mundo 
 Pascual de Gregorio at playmakerstats.com (English version of ceroacero.es)

1972 births
Living people
People from Coronel
Chilean people of Italian descent
Chilean footballers
Chilean expatriate footballers
Audax Italiano footballers
Provincial Osorno footballers
Deportes Melipilla footballers
Club Deportivo Palestino footballers
Deportes Santa Cruz footballers
Rangers de Talca footballers
Santiago Morning footballers
Coquimbo Unido footballers
S.S.C. Bari players
Cobreloa footballers
Gansu Tianma F.C. players
Santiago Wanderers footballers
Unión San Felipe footballers
Chilean Primera División players
Primera B de Chile players
Serie A players
Chinese Super League players
Chilean expatriate sportspeople in Italy
Chilean expatriate sportspeople in China
Expatriate footballers in Italy
Expatriate footballers in China
Association football forwards
Chilean football managers